Eros De Santis (born 30 October 1997) is an Italian professional footballer who plays as a right-back for  club Latina.

Club career
De Santis made his Serie B debut for Virtus Entella on 24 October 2017, in a game against Cremonese.

On 31 January 2019, Monza announced the signing of De Santis on loan from Siena, with an option to make the deal permanent at the end of the season.

On 16 January 2020, he joined Serie C club Viterbese.

International career
De Santis was a youth international for Italy.

References

External links
 

1997 births
Living people
People from Tivoli, Lazio
Sportspeople from the Metropolitan City of Rome Capital
Footballers from Lazio
Italian footballers
Association football fullbacks
Serie B players
Serie C players
A.S. Roma players
Virtus Entella players
A.C.N. Siena 1904 players
A.C. Monza players
U.S. Viterbese 1908 players
Latina Calcio 1932 players
Italy youth international footballers